In mathematics, the Killing form, named after Wilhelm Killing, is a symmetric bilinear form that plays a basic role in the theories of Lie groups and Lie algebras. Cartan's criteria (criterion of solvability and criterion of semisimplicity) show that Killing form has a close relationship to the semisimplicity of the Lie algebras.

History and name
In a historical survey of Lie theory,  has described how the term "Killing form" first occurred in 1951 during one of his own reports for the Séminaire Bourbaki; it arose as a misnomer, since the form had previously been used by Lie theorists, without a name attached. Some other authors now employ the term "Cartan-Killing form". At the end of the 19th century, Killing had noted that the coefficients of the characteristic equation of a regular semisimple element of a Lie algebra are invariant under the adjoint group, from which it follows that the Killing form (i.e. the degree 2 coefficient) is invariant, but he did not make much use of the fact. A basic result that Cartan made use of was Cartan's criterion, which states that the Killing form is non-degenerate if and only if the Lie algebra is a direct sum of simple Lie algebras.

Definition 

Consider a Lie algebra  over a field .

Now, supposing  is of finite dimension, the trace of the composition of two such endomorphisms defines a symmetric bilinear form

Properties 
The following properties follow as theorems from the above definition.

 The Killing form  is bilinear and symmetric. 
 The Killing form is an invariant form, as are all other forms obtained from Casimir operators. The derivation of Casimir operators vanishes; for the Killing form, this vanishing can be written as
 
  
 where [ , ] is the Lie bracket.

 The Killing form is also invariant under automorphisms  of the algebra , that is,

 The Cartan criterion states that a Lie algebra is semisimple if and only if the Killing form is non-degenerate.
 The Killing form of a nilpotent Lie algebra is identically zero.

Matrix elements 

Given a basis  of the Lie algebra , the matrix elements of the Killing form are given by

Here

The index  functions as column index and the index  as row index in the matrix . Taking the trace amounts to putting  and summing, and so we can write

The Killing form is the simplest 2-tensor that can be formed from the structure constants. The form itself is then 

In the above indexed definition, we are careful to distinguish upper and lower indices (co- and contra-variant indices).  This is because, in many cases, the Killing form can be used as a metric tensor on a manifold, in which case the distinction becomes an important one for the transformation properties of tensors. When the Lie algebra is semisimple over a zero-characteristic field, its Killing form is nondegenerate, and hence can be used as a metric tensor to raise and lower indexes.  In this case, it is always possible to choose a basis for  such that the structure constants with all upper indices are completely antisymmetric.

The table shows that the Dynkin index for the adjoint representation is equal to twice the dual Coxeter number.

Connection with real forms 

Suppose that  is a semisimple Lie algebra over the field of real numbers . By Cartan's criterion, the Killing form is nondegenerate, and can be diagonalized in a suitable basis with the diagonal entries . By Sylvester's law of inertia, the number of positive entries is an invariant of the bilinear form, i.e. it does not depend on the choice of the diagonalizing basis, and is called the index of the Lie algebra . In particular, a real Lie algebra  is called compact if the Killing form is negative definite (or negative semidefinite if the Lie algebra is not semisimple). Note that this is one of two inequivalent definitions commonly used for compactness of a Lie algebra; the other states that a Lie algebra is compact if it corresponds to a compact Lie group. The definition of compactness in terms of negative definiteness of the Killing form is more restrictive, since using this definition it can be shown that under the Lie correspondence, compact Lie algebras correspond to compact Lie groups.

It turns out that every complex semisimple Lie algebra admits a unique (up to isomorphism) compact real form . The real forms of a given complex semisimple Lie algebra are frequently labeled by the positive index of inertia of their Killing form.

For example, the complex special linear algebra  has two real forms, the real special linear algebra, denoted , and the special unitary algebra, denoted . The first one is noncompact, the so-called split real form, and its Killing form has signature . The second one is the compact real form and its Killing form is negative definite, i.e. has signature . The corresponding Lie groups are the noncompact group  of  real matrices with the unit determinant and the special unitary group , which is compact.

Trace forms 
Let  be a finite-dimensional Lie algebra over the field , and  be a Lie algebra representation. Then we can define the trace form for the representation  as

Then the Killing form is the special case that the representation is the adjoint representation, . 

It is easy to show that this is symmetric, bilinear and invariant for any representation .

See also 
 Casimir invariant
 Killing vector field

Citations

References 

Lie groups
Lie algebras